is a former Japanese international table tennis player.

Table tennis career
Hayashi won a gold medal in the doubles with Norikazu Fujii at the 1952 World Table Tennis Championships .

He also won a bronze medal in the men's team event at the 1952 World Table Tennis Championships.

See also
 List of table tennis players
 List of World Table Tennis Championships medalists

References

Japanese male table tennis players
World Table Tennis Championships medalists
Year of birth missing (living people)